The 2000 NCAA Division II women's basketball tournament was the 19th annual tournament hosted by the NCAA to determine the national champion of Division II women's  collegiate basketball in the United States.

Northern Kentucky defeated North Dakota State in the championship game, 71–62 (after one overtime), to claim the Norse's first NCAA Division II national title.

The championship rounds were contested in Pine Bluff, Arkansas.

Regionals

East - Shippensburg, Pennsylvania
Location: Heiges Field House Host: Shippensburg University of Pennsylvania

Great Lakes - Highland Heights, Kentucky
Location: Regents Hall Host: Northern Kentucky University

North Central - Fargo, North Dakota
Location: Bison Sports Arena Host: North Dakota State University

Northeast - Albany, New York
Location: Activities Center Host: College of Saint Rose

South - Cleveland, Mississippi
Location: Walter Sillers Coliseum Host: Delta State University

South Atlantic - Clinton, South Carolina
Location: Templeton Physical Education Center Host: Presbyterian College

South Central - Emporia, Kansas
Location: White Auditorium Host: Emporia State University

West - Pomona, California
Location: Kellogg Gym Host: California State Polytechnic University, Pomona

Elite Eight - Pine Bluff, Arkansas
Location: Pine Bluff Convention Center Host: University of Arkansas at Pine Bluff

All-tournament team
 Michelle Cottrell, Northern Kentucky
 Michele Tuchfarber, Northern Kentucky
 Jayne Boeddeker, North Dakota State
 Jayne Even, North Dakota State
 Caroline Boclair, Delta State
 Celeste Hill, Western Washington

See also
 2000 NCAA Division II men's basketball tournament
 2000 NCAA Division I women's basketball tournament
 2000 NCAA Division III women's basketball tournament
 2000 NAIA Division I women's basketball tournament
 2000 NAIA Division II women's basketball tournament

References
 2000 NCAA Division II women's basketball tournament jonfmorse.com

 
NCAA Division II women's basketball tournament
2000 in sports in Arkansas